The Nunavut Brier Playdowns are the annual tournament held to determine Nunavut's representative at the Tim Hortons Brier, Canada's national men's curling championship.

Summary
Nunavut, Canada's newest territory, was granted its own team at the Brier in 2015, but declined the invitation in that year's Brier. The territory held its first Brier playdown in 2016 , when Iqaluit's Wade Kingdon rink beat Rankin Inlet's Arthur Siksik rink 3 games to 1 in a best of 5 series.  At the 2016 Tim Hortons Brier, the team played in a pre-qualifying tournament, losing all three games.

In 2017, Jim Nix of New Glasgow, Nova Scotia was asked by a friend to join a club team in Iqaluit and proceeded to win a two-game series to represent Nunavut at the 2017 Tim Hortons Brier. At the Brier, the team lost all three games in the pre-qualifying tournament.

2018 had a similar situation, when St. Marys, Ontario resident David St. Louis was asked by friends in Iqaluit, where he used to work to join their team. The team beat the Jake Higgs rink to represent Nunavut at the 2018 Tim Hortons Brier. Curling Canada abolished the pre-qualifying tournament at the 2018 Brier, which was replaced by two pools of eight teams. At the Brier, the team lost all seven pool games, and the 15th place game.

St. Louis defeated Higgs again in the 2019 playdowns. Skipping Nunavut at the 2019 Tim Hortons Brier he led the territory to another 0–7 record.

World Curling Tour veteran Jake Higgs from Strathroy, Ontario won the Brier playdown for 2020 on his third try. He led is team to a 3–0 record in the three-team tournament which also featured St. Louis and Kingdon. Higgs had played for Ontario at the 2009 Canadian Mixed Curling Championship which was held in Iqaluit, where he was acquainted with some local curlers, who suggested he come to town to try and win the playdown. His experience did not help Team Nunavut at the 2020 Tim Hortons Brier however, as the team went 0-7 again.

In 2021, Nunavut was one of the few member associations in Canada to have a playdown due the COVID-19 pandemic, which forced other jurisdictions to cancel their respective championships. The Nunavut playdown was a best-of-five series between Peter Mackey and Wade Kingdon. After going down two games to none, the Mackey rink came back to win three straight, winning the title. Because of the pandemic, the 2021 Tim Hortons Brier had two more "wild card" teams, which expanded the field to 18 teams, adding one more game to Nunavut's schedule. Adding an extra game did not help Team Nunavut, as the team once again lost all of their games, going 0–8.

In 2022, Mackey once again represented Nunavut at the Brier. At the 2022 Tim Hortons Brier, by which time the tournament was permanently expanded to eighteen teams, the team went winless in eight games.

The 2023 playdowns were held in December 2022. They were won by Jake Higgs, who defeated Peter Mackey 8–7 in the final. The event was a three-team double round robin with a final, and also involved Team Peter Van Strien. Higgs' team earned Nunavut's first Brier win at the 2023 Tim Hortons Brier when they defeated Nathan Young of Newfoundland and Labrador in their first game. They went on to lose their next seven games, to finish with a 1–7 record.

Winners

Notes

References

Curling in Nunavut
The Brier provincial tournaments